This page shows the progress of Carlisle United F.C.'s campaign in the 2013–14 football season. In this season they competed in the third tier of English football, League One. After the completion of the season the club was relegated to League Two for the 2014–15 season.

League data

League table

Squad statistics

 
 
 

 
 

 
 

|}

Top scorers

Disciplinary record

Results 
The pre-season friendlies for the club were announced 10 June 2013.

Pre-season friendlies

League One 

 

Carlisle United relegated to League Two for the 2014–15 season

FA Cup

Football League Cup

JP Trophy

Transfers

References

Carlisle United F.C. seasons
Carlisle United